Mossiface Railway Station and siding was opened on Monday 10 April 1916 as part of the Orbost railway line. The station has long since closed, with the last train passing the site in 1987.

The former station grounds have been preserved, and are surrounded by the small Mossiface township consisting of a few houses, farms, and facilities, including some historic hop kilns. The site overlooks the Tambo River flats, which are used as productive grazing farmland.

A station name board exists at the site as part of the East Gippsland Rail Trail, which follows the route of the former rail line.

References

Disused railway stations in Victoria (Australia)
Transport in Gippsland (region)
Shire of East Gippsland